Tiger Express is a steel wild mouse roller coaster located at La Mer de Sable in France. From 2000 until late 2010, the roller coaster was located in Walibi Holland in the Netherlands under the name Flying Dutchman Gold Mine.

See also

 2011 in amusement parks

References

Roller coasters in France